The 1995–96 New York Islanders season was the 24th season in the franchise's history. This season saw the Islanders finish in last place with a record of 22–50–10 and miss the playoffs for the second straight year. During the season, team management fired General Manager Don Maloney, whom fans blamed for the team's downfall, and gave Mike Milbury total control of hockey operations as both head coach and general manager.

Offseason

Before the 1995–96 season, Don Maloney fired Lorne Henning and named Mike Milbury head coach. The same year, the Isles' attempt at updating their look resulted in the unveiling of the "fisherman" logo. It proved to be such a disaster that the team announced less than a year after unveiling it that they would go back to their original logo as soon as league rules could allow. Rangers fans still mock the Islanders with chants of "we want fishsticks," a reference to the way the logo resembled the Gorton's fisherman.

Regular season

Season standings

Schedule and results

Player statistics

Regular season
Scoring

Goaltending

Note: Pos = Position; GP = Games played; G = Goals; A = Assists; Pts = Points; +/- = plus/minus; PIM = Penalty minutes; PPG = Power-play goals; SHG = Short-handed goals; GWG = Game-winning goals
      MIN = Minutes played; W = Wins; L = Losses; T = Ties; GA = Goals-against; GAA = Goals-against average; SO = Shutouts; SA = Shots against; SV = Shots saved; SV% = Save percentage;

Awards and records

Transactions

Draft picks
New York's draft picks at the 1995 NHL Entry Draft held at the Edmonton Coliseum in Edmonton, Alberta.

References
Islanders on Hockey Database

New York Islanders seasons
New York Islanders
New York Islanders
New York Islanders
New York Islanders